Allium spathaceum, the Ethiopian onion, is a plant species native to Ethiopia, Eritrea, Djibouti, Somalia and Sudan. Of the 900 known species of onion in the world, this is one of only a few that are endemic to the area.

Allium spathaceum is a bulb-forming perennial up to 40 cm tall, with a scent similar to that of onion or leeks. It has very narrow, linear leaves with hairs along the edges. The umbel contains only a few flowers, with long pedicels. Tepals are white with reddish midveins.

References

External links
photo of herbarium specimen at Missouri Botanical Garden, Allium spathaceum, collected Ethiopia in 1838

spathaceum
Onions
Flora of Sudan
Flora of Somalia
Flora of Djibouti
Flora of Eritrea
Flora of Ethiopia
Plants described in 1850